A communication engine is a tool that sends user requests to several other communication protocols and/or databases and aggregates the results into a single list or displays them according to their source. Communication engines enable users to enter communication account authorization once and access several communication avenues simultaneously. Communication engines operate on the premise that the World Wide Web is too large for any one engine to index it all and that more productive results can be obtained by combining the results from several engines dynamically. This may save the user from having to use multiple engines separately.

Information retrieval techniques
Computing terminology